Rachid Mekhloufi (born 12 August 1936 in Sétif, French Algeria) is a French-Algerian former football striker. He later became a manager and coached the Algeria national football team.

International career 
In the middle of the Algerian War, on 13 April 1958, ten of the most well-known France-Based professional football (soccer) players fled from France to go and play for their new FLN football team. This team was created from the National Liberation Front (Algeria). One of these 10 players was Rachid Mekhloufi. Rachid, "abandoned the French team preparing for the World Cup Finals in Sweden and instantly became an Algerian national symbol." By the summer, more and more France-based Algerians came to join the original ten who fled. Rachid and his fellow teammates wanted to show the French people the serious war that was going on in Algeria. Many of them did not realize the extent of the war going on, and when ten high-caliber players left, the French citizens had to wonder and figure out the exact reason why-especially when a few of the footballers were preparing for the World Cup Finals. At the same time, both Rachid and his teammates gave a sense of nationalism to the Citizens of Algeria during their efforts in the War. Mekhloufi (and many others) sacrificed their careers by playing in less competitive environments with lesser demanding training regimes. Mekhloufi is quoted saying "I had lost the taste for effort, the necessary fight" when asked about playing political football.

Career statistics

Club

International
Scores and results list Algeria's goal tally first. "Score" column indicates the score after the player's goal.

Honours

Player
Saint-Étienne
 French Division 1: 1956–57, 1963–64, 1966–67, 1967–68
 Coupe de France: 1968
 Trophée des Champions: 1957, 1967
 Coupe Charles Drago: 1955, 1958

France military
 Military World Cup: 1957

Individual
 All-time AS Saint-Étienne top scorer: 192 goals

Manager
Algeria
 Mediterranean Games gold medal: 1975
 All-Africa Games gold medal: 1978

Individual
 Lebanese Premier League Best Coach: 1996–97

References

External links
Profile

Short bio
Another bio

1936 births
Living people
French footballers
France international footballers
Algerian footballers
Algeria international footballers
Algerian expatriate footballers
Dual internationalists (football)
Association football midfielders
Ligue 1 players
AS Saint-Étienne players
Servette FC players
SC Bastia players
French sportspeople of Algerian descent
Algerian football managers
SC Bastia managers
Al-Riyadh SC managers
1982 FIFA World Cup managers
Footballers from Sétif
Algeria national football team managers
Algerian expatriate sportspeople in Tunisia
USM Sétif players
Algerian expatriate sportspeople in Switzerland
Expatriate footballers in Switzerland
Algerian expatriate sportspeople in France
Expatriate footballers in France
Algerian expatriate sportspeople in Saudi Arabia
Expatriate football managers in Saudi Arabia
FLN football team players
Saudi Professional League managers